Joseph Charles Marien (25 January 1900 – 14 December 1950) was a Belgian marathon runner. He competed at the 1928 Summer Olympics and finished in 56th place.

References

External links
 

1900 births
1950 deaths
Belgian male long-distance runners
Belgian male marathon runners
Olympic athletes of Belgium
Athletes (track and field) at the 1928 Summer Olympics